Pilosella schultesii is a European plant species in the tribe Cichorieae within the family Asteraceae. It grows France including Corsica, Sardinia, Switzerland, Austria, Switzerland, Hungary, Romania, and Slovenia.

References

schultesii
Flora of Europe
Plants described in 1861